The Special Operations Command (SOKOM) is a command of Danish Defence part of the Defence Command. SOKOM was established in 2014 to bring the Jaeger Corps and the Frogman Corps under one command. It is based at Aalborg Air Base.

Role
SOKOM was established on 1 September 2014 as part of the Danish Defence Agreement 2013-2017; Major General Jørgen Høll was appointed its first chief. SOKOM was created with the aim of "strengthening and increasing the future capabilities within special operations, including capabilities of the Air Force".

On 1 July 2015, the Jaeger Corps was transferred from the Royal Danish Army and the Frogman Corps from the Royal Danish Navy to SOKOM.

SOKOM is tasked with working with national and international partners, where SOKOM will be able to offer a special operations alternative to conventional military solutions and to be able to deploy a headquarters element to support special operations on foreign soil.

Divisions
 Frogman Corps
 Jaeger Corps
 Sirius Dog Sled Patrol

Commanding officer

See also
 United States Special Operations Command
 Special Forces Command (Sweden)

References

External links
 Danish Defence SOKOM (in Danish)
 

Special forces
Special forces of Denmark
Military of Denmark
Military units and formations established in 2014